Garrisonville is an unincorporated community in Stafford County in the U.S. state of Virginia.

Geography

Transportation

Garrisonville is served by State Route 610 (Garrisonville Road), which passes east—west through the community, and Interstate 95 and U.S. Route 1, which run north—south to the east.

References

Unincorporated communities in Stafford County, Virginia
Unincorporated communities in Virginia